Robert Devell Moore (November 8, 1958 – April 10, 2015) was a Major League Baseball pitcher, who played briefly during one season at the major league level with the San Francisco Giants, appearing in 16.2 innings through 11 games, compiling a 3.24 ERA.

He was originally signed by the Oakland Athletics in the 11th round of the 1976 amateur draft.

Bobby Moore played his first professional season with their Class A (Short Season) Boise A's in 1976, and split his last season between the California Angels' Double-A Midland Angels and the Cincinnati Reds' Triple-A Nashville Sounds in 1990.

All together he finished with a career minor league won-lost mark of 55-86, both as a starter and reliever, with a 5.28 ERA over 1223 innings pitched.

References

Baseball Almanac

1958 births
2015 deaths
African-American baseball players
San Francisco Giants players
Major League Baseball pitchers
Baseball players from Louisiana
Boise A's players
Medicine Hat A's players
Modesto A's players
Waterbury A's players
West Haven Whitecaps players
San Jose Missions players
West Haven A's players
Madison Muskies players
Glens Falls White Sox players
Stockton Ports players
Shreveport Captains players
Phoenix Giants players
Oklahoma City 89ers players
Phoenix Firebirds players
San Jose Bees players
Glens Falls Tigers players
Nashville Sounds players
Midland Angels players
Pueblo Bighorns players
Tri-City Posse players
20th-century African-American sportspeople
21st-century African-American people
Bravos de León players
American expatriate baseball players in Mexico
Wei Chuan Dragons players
American expatriate baseball players in Taiwan